Pedro Eugenio might refer to:

Pedro Eugênio (1949–2015), Brazilian politician
Pedro Eugénio (born 1990), Portuguese footballer
Pedro Eugenio Aramburu (1903–1970), Argentine soldier and politician
Pedro Eugenio Pelletier, French-Dominican soldier